Martrez Milner (born August 8, 1984) is a former American football tight end. He was drafted by the Atlanta Falcons in the fourth round of the 2007 NFL Draft. He played college football at Georgia.

Milner has also been a member of the New York Giants, New York Jets, and New Orleans Saints.

Professional career

Atlanta Falcons
Milner was drafted by the Atlanta Falcons in the fourth round of the 2007 NFL Draft. He was released on September 16, 2008.

New York Giants
Later in September, the New York Giants signed Milner to their practice squad. Following the season, he was re-signed to a future contract on January 12, 2009. He waived on May 21, 2009.

New York Jets
Milner was claimed off waivers by the New York Jets on May 27, 2009. He was waived on June 11, 2009.

New Orleans Saints
Milner signed with the New Orleans Saints on August 16, 2009. He was waived on September 5, 2009.

External links
Georgia Bulldogs bio
New Orleans bio

1984 births
Living people
Players of American football from Georgia (U.S. state)
American football tight ends
Georgia Bulldogs football players
Atlanta Falcons players
New York Giants players
New York Jets players
New Orleans Saints players